Kayserili Hacı Salih Pasha (died 1801 or 1802, Trabzon) was an Ottoman statesman, originally from the city of Kayseri in central Anatolia. He served as the Ottoman governor of Bosnia (1789–90 and 1791–92), Egypt (15 October 1794 – 7 June 1796), Diyarbekir (1796–99), and Trebizond (1799–1801 or 1802), dying in 1801 or 1802.

See also
 List of Ottoman governors of Bosnia
 List of Ottoman governors of Egypt

References

18th-century births
1800s deaths

Year of birth unknown
Year of death uncertain
18th-century Ottoman governors of Egypt
19th-century people from the Ottoman Empire
Ottoman governors of Egypt
Ottoman governors of Bosnia
Pashas
People from Kayseri